Keithsburg is a city in Mercer County, Illinois, United States, on the Mississippi River. The population was 550 at the 2020 census, down from 609 in 2010. It was named for Robert Keith, a pioneer settler.

Geography
Keithsburg is located in southwestern Mercer County at  (41.100020, -90.937293). It is sited on the east bank of the Mississippi River, downstream from the inlet of Pope Creek.

The Keithsburg Division of the Mark Twain National Wildlife Refuge Complex lies north of Keithsburg.

Demographics

As of the census of 2000, there were 714 people, 278 households, and 199 families residing in the city. The racial makeup of the city was 98.32% White, 0.28% Native American, and 1.40% from two or more races. Hispanic or Latino of any race were 0.42% of the population.

There were 2780 households, out of which 30.2% had children under the age of 18 living with them, 57.2% were married couples living together, 10.1% had a female householder with no husband present, and 28.1% were non-families. 24.5% of all households were made up of individuals, and 16.9% had someone living alone who was 65 years of age or older. The average household size was 2.57 and the average family size was 2.96.

In the city population was spread out, with 26.9% under the age of 18, 7.7% from 18 to 24, 26.6% from 25 to 44, 22.1% from 45 to 64, and 16.7% who were 65 years of age or older. The median age was 36 years. For every 100 females, there were 91.4 males. For every 100 females age 18 and over, there were 88.4 males.

The median income for a household in the city was $32,500, and the median income for a family was $40,781. Males had a median income of $27,000 versus $16,719 for females. The per capita income for the city was $14,008. About 10.3% of families and 14.0% of the population were below the poverty line, including 16.1% of those under age 18 and 4.8% of those age 65 or over.

Notable person

 Parke Wilson, catcher for the New York Giants; born in Keithsburg

Floods
Keithsburg lies next to the Mississippi River. During the Great Flood of 1993, Keithsburg was heavily damaged. The town rebuilt and resumed normal activity. On June 14, 2008, two nearby levees broke, which flooded the town of Keithsburg again.

References

External links

Illinois populated places on the Mississippi River
Cities in Mercer County, Illinois